Touched by an Angel is an American fantasy drama television series that premiered on CBS on September 21, 1994, and ran for 211 episodes over nine seasons until its conclusion on April 27, 2003. Created by John Masius and executive produced by Martha Williamson, the series stars Roma Downey as an angel named Monica, and Della Reese as her supervisor Tess. Throughout the series, Monica is tasked with bringing guidance and messages from God to various people who are at a crossroads in their lives. From season three onward, they are frequently joined by Andrew (John Dye), the Angel of Death (who first appeared as a recurring character in season two).

Plot
The episodes of the series generally revolved around the "cases" of Monica (played by Roma Downey), an angel recently promoted from the "search and rescue" division, who works under the guidance of Tess (played by Della Reese), a sarcastic boss who is sometimes hard on her teen colleague, but is more of a surrogate mother than a mentor.

Monica in one episode outlines that she started in the choir, then annunciations, followed by search and rescue and then case work. Most cases involve a single person or a group of people who are at a crossroads in their lives and facing a large problem or tough decision. Monica and Tess bring them messages of hope from God and give them guidance to help make decisions. During their first episode, the pair receive a red 1972 Cadillac Eldorado convertible as a gift; they use it for transportation throughout the rest of the series while in the human world, with Tess doing the driving. As the series progresses, Monica continues gaining experience as a case worker and, during some cases must learn lessons of her own.

During the series pilot, an angel of death named Adam is introduced. In the season two premiere, "Interview with an Angel", a new Angel of Death named Henry is introduced. Then in the season two episode entitled "The One That Got Away", Andrew (played by John Dye) is introduced as the Angel of Death. Initially a recurring character, he becomes a main character in season three, making him the permanent Angel of Death for the remainder of the series. The original angel of death, Adam, continued to appear in guest appearances over the next few seasons.

In Season 4, a new angel is introduced named Rafael (Alexis Cruz), who appears throughout the series on a recurring basis, often assisting the main trio (Monica, Tess, and Andrew) in their cases. Rafael is a younger looking angel than the others and thus is occasionally involved in situations involving teenagers and young adults so they can relate to each other. Towards the end of the seventh season, a new angel, Gloria (Valerie Bertinelli), is created by God during one of Monica's assignments, designed to adapt to life on Earth in the 21st century. She becomes a regular character for seasons eight and nine, as a trainee under Monica and Tess's guidance.

In the series finale, Monica is up for promotion to supervisor, pending the outcome of a difficult case in which she must defend Zach (Scott Bairstow), an innocent drifter accused of causing a boiler explosion at a school two years ago in the small town of Ascension, Colorado. The explosion killed most of the children, leaving the citizens devastated. During the case, Monica sees many familiar faces, including Joey Machulis (Paul Wittenburg), one of Monica's previous assignments who is a witness to the events, his brother Wayne (Randy Travis), who is now sheriff, Sophie (Marion Ross), a formerly homeless acquaintance, and Mike (Patrick Duffy), a lawyer Monica saved during her search and rescue days who is now the Mayor. An out of town developer claims Zach is the perpetrator and despite the lack of evidence, Zach is put on trial. Monica does all she can to help him, including asking Mike to represent him, but the prosecutor in the case, Jones, is really Satan in disguise, and Zach is eventually convicted.

After the trial, Monica is able to help the citizens realize their mistake and to see that Zach's return to the town had helped them finally start living again. They begin going back to church, welcomed by the pastor they had once abandoned. Their change of heart, however, cannot free Zach, so Monica visits him in jail and reveals that she is an angel. She then promises him that she will become his guardian angel, forgoing all future assignments and the coveted promotion, to protect him from harm in prison. When she returns in the morning, however, the cell is empty. The citizens decide not to search for him, and it is revealed that Joey inadvertently caused the explosion after the devil tricked him into turning the boiler too high to warm some kittens he'd found.

The perplexed Monica returns to the desert to find Tess and Zach. There, she learns that Zach was actually Jesus, and that her defending him was a test, which she passed by being willing to sacrifice herself for him. Monica is promoted to supervisor. As she leaves, she says her goodbyes to Gloria, and to Andrew, who gives her a pocket watch to remember their friendship by. Before parting, Tess gives Monica the keys to the Cadillac, as she is leaving her job to sit at God's feet. Monica is last shown driving away as the camera pans out over the desert.

Episodes

Cast and characters

Main
Roma Downey as Monica, a kind-hearted Irish angel prone to getting in trouble, who is sent town-to-town to encourage people. Sometimes shown in her bare feet, she is the show's main protagonist. She appears in all but two episodes.
Della Reese as Tess, a tough and sarcastic, but loving African American supervisor who plays a key role in every one of Monica's cases. She acts like Monica's stepmother and is also the show's main protagonist. She appears in all but three episodes.
John Dye as Andrew (main, seasons 3–9; recurring, season 2), known as "the Angel of Death".
Valerie Bertinelli as Gloria (main, seasons 8–9; guest, season 7), an accident prone intelligent Italian American angel made to understand the way of life in the 21st century. She acts like Monica's older stepsister, but having little to no understanding of the human condition making her seem childlike in her innocence.

Recurring 
Alexis Cruz as Rafael, an angel
Charles Rocket as Adam, an angel of death
Paul Winfield as Sam, an archangel
Randy Travis as Wayne Machulis and as Jed Winslow
Wendy Phillips as Claire Greene (also as Ruth Ann Russell in one episode)
Gerald McRaney as Russell Greene (also as Dr. Joe Patcherik in one episode)
Celeste Holm as Hattie Greene
Eddie Karr as Nathaniel Greene
Paul Wittenburg as Joey Machulis
Cloris Leachman as Ruth, an archangel
Ossie Davis as Erasmus Jones and as Gabriel, an archangel
Jasmine Guy as Kathleen, a fallen angel

Notable guest stars
Bruce Altman as Henry, an angel of death 
Chris Burke as Taylor, an angel 
Delta Burke as Diana Winslow / Julia Fitzgerald
Carol Burnett as Lillian Bennett (season 4, episode 10) 
Bill Cosby as Phil, the Angel of Restoration
Barbara Mandrell as Ada Dobbin / Terri Hayman
David Ogden Stiers as Jones / Satan (in the two-part series finale)
Phylicia Rashad as Elizabeth Jessup
Muhammad Ali as himself (season 5, episode 24)
Maya Angelou as Clarice Mitchell (season 2, episode 7)
Ruby Dee as LaBelle (season 6, episode 10)
Celine Dion as herself (season 5, episode 9)
Kirk Douglas as Ross Burger (season 6, episode 18)
Marla Gibbs as Millie (season 7, episode 3)
George Grizzard as Charley Nott (season 5, episode 11)
Melissa Joan Hart as Claire Latham (season 2, episode 5)
Wynonna Judd as Audrey Carmichael
Angela Lansbury as Lady Penelope Berrington (season 8, episode 21)
David Margulies as Sam Silverstein (season 8, episode 5)
Russell Means as Edison (season 3, episode 5) 
Maureen McCormick as Jodi (season 3, episode 18)
Keb' Mo' as the Angel of Music
Joe Morton as Martin Hunter / Jake Stone
Margot Kidder as Rita Lasky (season 5, episode 1)
Cynthia Nixon as Melina Richardson/Sister Sarah (season 5, episode 20)
Pedro Pascal as Ricky Hauk (season 6, episode 22) 
Rosa Parks as herself (season 5, episode 23)
*NSYNC as street performers (season 6, episode 7)
Mandy Patinkin as Satan (season 7, episode 23)
Debbie Reynolds as Betty Poplovich (season 8, episode 4)
Sally Ride as herself (season 5, episode 26) 
John Schneider as Joshua Winslow / Satan
Mary McDonnell as Sister Theodore (season 8, episode 18)
Luther Vandross as Reggie Hunter (season 8, episode 20)
Richard Chamberlain as Jack Clay/Everett Clay (season 7, episode 1)
Al Jarreau as himself (season 2, episode 15)
B.B. King as himself (season 2, episode 15)
Dr. John as himself (season 2, episode 15)
Al Hirt as himself (season 2, episode 15)
Ann-Margret as Angela (episode "Millennium")
Rue McClanahan as Amelia Bowthorpe Archibald (Episode "Manny") and Lila Winslow (Episode "Shallow Water")
Linda Gray as Marian Campbell (season 2, episode 20)
Sally Jessy Raphael as Mrs. Angeli (season 2, episode 22) 
Kenny Rogers as Denny Blye (season 6, episode 14) 
Marion Ross as Sophie
Jennifer Paz as Am-Nhac Nguyen (season 5, episode 21 "Made in the USA")

The show also featured early appearances by Jack Black, James Marsden, Shia LaBeouf, Brie Larson, Kirsten Dunst, Mary Elizabeth Winstead, and Bryan Cranston.

Production
Touched by an Angel was produced by CBS and Moon Water Productions. The network had wanted to do a series about angels after reading a story in Newsweek about how belief in angels was becoming popular. Most episodes of the series were produced in Salt Lake City, Utah.  According to New York Times reviewer Caryn James, John Masius created the first pilot episode for the series, but it was a darker, less hopeful story than the producers wanted. It cost the studio $2 million to produce the episode. Masius wrote the show as a reflection of his spiritual anger at the time due to his two children being born disabled. Martha Williamson was approached to be the series executive producer in early 1994. She described the pilot she received as "upsetting" as it "portrayed angels as recycled dead people with power over life and death." She initially declined the position, but during a lunch with Andy Hill, then President of CBS, she mentioned the show and suggested he find a producer who would create a show with "loving, joyful" angels that the audience would have to believe in.

Williamson stated that she could not stop thinking about the show after that meeting, and eventually called to ask if the position was still open. Though getting the position was no longer a sure thing, she passed up a more lucrative position directing a court drama and went in for an interview with CBS in June 1994. During her interview, she states she emphasized that she was a Christian and could only do a show that depicted angels in a way she felt was true to her view of angels and that was respectful towards God. She also indicated that the pilot should be redone from the beginning, keeping only the characters Monica and Tess, reworked. The studio agreed with her remarks and hired her. Williamson herself wrote a new script for the pilot episode, while also working on hiring the remaining staff for the series, which was due to premiere in September. The pilot was filmed in Salt Lake City, Utah and the show was ready on schedule. The first episode aired on September 14, 1994.

Theme song
The lyrics to the show's theme song, "Walk with You", are sung at the beginning of each episode by Della Reese.

Spin-off
In 1996, Promised Land was launched as a spin-off series, following the Greene family whom Monica had met during one of her cases, as they travel the United States helping those in need. Four crossover episodes aired during Promised Lands three-season run.

Broadcast and syndication
The series went into syndication in 1998, and has aired on PAX-TV, Hallmark Channel, CBS Drama, Up, MeTV and Start TV. It has also aired on Hallmark Drama.

Home media
CBS DVD (distributed by Paramount) has released all nine seasons on DVD in Region 1. Seasons 1, 2, 5–9 were released as single season box sets, while seasons 3 & 4 were released as two volume sets.

On February 9, 2016, CBS DVD released Touched by an Angel: The Complete Series on DVD in Region 1.

Four themed sets, each containing four episodes, have also been released. The first two, "The Inspiration Collection: Holiday" and "The Inspiration Collection: Hope" were released on November 10, 2009; "The Inspiration Collection: Faith" and "The Inspiration Collection: Love" were released January 26, 2010.

In Region 4, Shock Records has released five volumes of episodes from the series, each containing nine episodes and a set containing all five volumes together.

Reception

Critical
Touched by an Angel received negative reviews from critics who derided its use of treacly melodrama. Tom Shales of The Washington Post said, "viewers with low tolerance for precious whimsy will probably find they have overdosed on pixie dust within the first 10 minutes." Michael Blowen of The Boston Globe wrote, "If you loved Michael Landon's 'Highway to Heaven', a show pooh-poohed by the critics that became a huge hit, you'll probably go for this sugary, maudlin, sentimental myth-making." David Zurawik of The Baltimore Sun opined it was "the worst new series of the TV season [...] there's absolutely nothing divine about it." Commenting on frequent shots of Monica's bare feet in the first episode, Zurawik wrote, "I'm not sure what that's all about unless CBS has research showing a large audience of foot fetishists waiting for a reason not to watch ABC's Roseanne."

In a retrospective piece titled "Mauled by an Angel" for his column Religion Dispatches, W. Scott Poole stated that Downey and Reese "served up a syrupy but powerful advertisement for a greeting-card brand of religious faith with little theological definition, but a healthy serving of 'chicken soup for the soul' (a franchise that itself became popular in the same era)." He added the show "seemed to suggest that God was deeply concerned but mostly unable or unwilling to get directly involved, sending along his messengers to patch things up for humanity (or select portions of it) now and again." Writing of the first season, Ken Tucker of Entertainment Weekly, gave the show a “C” grade, and said the show "succeeds in being so unpretentiously, innocently pure-minded—this is the Forrest Gump of fall ’94—that it’s possible to feel sympathy for its ratings plight." Common Sense Media reviewer Emily Ashby gave the series 3 out of 5 stars, and said that "this uplifting, inspirational show is steeped in strong moral messages, life lessons, and Christian overtones that include multiple references to 'God,' 'Lord,' and the 'Father.'"

Ratings
Touched by an Angel became one of CBS's highest-rated series during season three and continued through season six, when it was the ninth most watched network series, with 17,190,000 viewers that amounted to a 15% share of the market as determined by Nielsen Media Research. In season eight, after the series moved from its Sunday time slot to a Saturday one, it dropped to 79th place, with 8.3 million viewers.

Awards
The series was nominated for eleven Primetime Emmy Awards between 1997 and 2000, including two nominations each for Downey and Reese in the Outstanding Lead Actress in a Drama Series and Outstanding Supporting Actress in a Drama Series categories, respectively. It was also nominated for three Golden Globe Awards, two in 1998 and 1999 for Downey for Best Performance by an Actress in a TV-Series - Drama, and one in 1998 for Reese for Best Performance by an Actress in a Supporting Role in a Series even though the series was never able to secure either award. Marc Lichtman was awarded five BMI Film and Television Awards for "Television Music" in 1997, 1998, 1999, 2000, and 2001 for his work as the series composer.

Email controversy
A 1999 variation of the "Madalyn Murray O'Hair petition" urban legend, which claims to seek a ban on religious programming, mentioned the show and appeared via e-mail chains despite O'Hair being deceased since 1995 and her original actual religious programming petition to the FCC being rejected in 1975.

In popular culture
Maria Bamford imitated Monica on the track "Touched by an Angel" on her Burning Tours album.

It was also spoofed on MadTV as "Touched by an Atheist" on an episode guest starring comedian George Carlin.

It was also spoofed on the Family Guy episode "Ready, Willing and Disabled".

Weird Al Yankovic's take of Eminem's "Lose Yourself" called "Couch Potato" changed the title to Touched by an Uncle.

It was parodied in the Birdgirl episode "Thirdgirl".

In other media
A book on the series, Touched by an Angel, was published by Zondervan in November 1997. Written by Williams and Robin Sheets, it contains background information on some of the stories featured, series production information, basic details on the first fifty episodes and profiles of Downey, Reese and Dye. It also has short story versions of four episodes: "Interview with an Angel", "There, but for the Grace of God", "An Unexpected Snow" and "Jacob's Ladder". A second book, In the Words of Angels: Twenty Inspiring Stories from Touched by an Angel, was published by Fireside Books on August 28, 2001. Also written by Williams, it collects twenty short stories based on episodes from the series.

An audio soundtrack, Touched by an Angel: The Album, was released on November 3, 1998. The 15-track CD includes a full-length version of the series theme song, "Walk with You", performed by Della Reese and songs by Céline Dion, Shawn Colvin, Bob Dylan, Faith Hill, Martina McBride, Amy Grant, Jaci Velasquez, The Kinleys, Wynonna and Amanda Marshall. The soundtrack went platinum. A second album, Touched by an Angel: Christmas Album, was released on November 9, 1999, with 13 tracks of Christmas music. In addition to having tracks performed by Reese and Downey, it features songs from Randy Travis, Keb' Mo', Charlotte Church, Kirk Franklin, Collin Raye, Amy Grant and Donna Summer. Both albums were released by Sony Music Entertainment, the successor to the former record division of CBS.

See also 
 Highway to Heaven - similar concept
 God Friended Me - similar concept
 7th Heaven - similar concept
 List of films about angels

Notes

References

External links 

 
 
 Official Website
 Touched by an Angel at UP TV Network

 
1990s American drama television series
1994 American television series debuts
2000s American drama television series
2003 American television series endings
Angels in television
CBS original programming
Christian entertainment television series
English-language television shows
Television series by CBS Studios
Films shot in Salt Lake City
Fiction about the Devil
Television shows set in Utah
Demons in television
American fantasy drama television series
Religious drama television series
Television series about angels